Galeria Lysistrate or Lysistrata (2nd-century) was the concubine of the Roman Emperor Antoninus Pius.  

She was originally the slave of Empress Faustina the Elder. She was later manumitted. She became the lover of Antoninus Pius after the death of Faustina in 138. She reportedly had a great deal of influence during the later reign of Antoninus Pius.

See also
 Claudia Acte
 Antonia Caenis
 Marcia (mistress of Commodus)

References

2nd-century Roman women
Emperor's slaves and freedmen
Antoninus Pius
Mistresses of Roman royalty
Concubines